Koiatu Koiatu (born Cook Islands, 26 November 1977) is a Cook Islands rugby union footballer. He plays as a fullback and as wing.

Career
Koiatu currently plays for Bombay and for Counties Manukau, in New Zealand. He is an international player for Cook Islands, both at XV and Sevens. He played at the IRB Sevens World Series, in 2006 and 2008.

Koiatu now lives in Perth Western Australia where he plays and coaches at Wanneroo Districts Rugby Union Club, historically and currently Perth's premier club.

References

External links
Profile of Koiatu Koiatu

1977 births
Living people
Cook Island rugby union players
Rugby union fullbacks
Rugby union wings
Commonwealth Games rugby sevens players of the Cook Islands
Rugby sevens players at the 2006 Commonwealth Games
Cook Islands international rugby union players
Cook Islands international rugby sevens players
Rugby sevens players at the 2014 Commonwealth Games